José María Julián de Lachambre y Domínguez (16 March 1846 - 13 July 1903) was a senator and the ad interim Spanish Governor-General of the Philippines after Camilo Polavieja was recalled by the Cánovas government who was displeased with Polavieja's policy. Fernando Primo de Rivera was appointed and took office for the second time as governor general (the first from 1880-1883) on April 23, 1897.

References

1846 births
1903 deaths
Captains General of the Philippines
People of the Philippine Revolution